Naturgy Energy Group S.A., formerly Gas Natural Fenosa, is a Spanish multinational natural gas and electrical energy utilities company, which operates primarily in Spain. The company's administrative headquarters are in Barcelona, while its legal headquarters are in Madrid.

It also has operations in other countries, including: Italy, France, Germany, The Netherlands, Belgium, Mexico, Colombia, Argentina, Brazil, Puerto Rico, Moldova, and Morocco.

Description
The corporation's main interests are: the distribution of natural gas in Spain, Italy, and Latin America; the generation and commercialisation of electricity in the liberalised Spanish market (1997-2009); and the management of natural gas infrastructure and shipping transport.

Gas Natural has approximately 10,000,000 energy clients worldwide. It has around 6,700 employees, of which approximately 50% work within Spain.

The group's largest shareholders include the Spanish La Caixa bank and Repsol global energy company. 

Gas Natural acquired utility company Unión Fenosa for around €16.8 billion in 2009.

In June 2018, the general shareholders meeting of Gas Natural approved the change of name of the company to Naturgy Energy Group.

Headquarters

The company's administrative headquarters complex, Gas Natural Building or Mare Nostrum Tower, is located in the La Barceloneta neighbourhood of the Ciutat Vella district in Barcelona. The skyscraper was designed in the High-tech architectural style by the EMBT Architects firm of architects Enric Miralles and Benedetta Tagliabue, and was completed in 2005.

Its legal headquarters were moved to Madrid in 2017, because of the Catalonia independence crisis. Naturgy's Madrid headquarter complex is located in the district of Hortaleza. This headquarters are a building complex of 14 buildings that Naturgy bought in 2016.

See also
 EcoEléctrica in Puerto Rico — Gas Natural is the major shareholder.

References

External links

Energy companies of Spain
Natural gas companies of Spain
Electric power companies of Spain
Multinational companies headquartered in Spain
Ciutat Vella
Energy companies established in 1991
Non-renewable resource companies established in 1991
Spanish companies established in 1991
IBEX 35
Companies listed on the Madrid Stock Exchange